Ann Stewart Peterson (born June 16, 1947) is an American diver who competed in the 10 meter platform event. She won bronze medals at both the 1967 Pan American Games and 1968 Olympics. Peterson won the Amateur Athletic Union championships and the U.S. Olympic trials in 1968.

Early life
Peterson began participating in competitive diving in 1957 with Dick Smith's Swim Gym, but quit in 1960 to move with her parents to Seattle, Washington. She joined the Gold Creek Swim Gym after arriving in Washington. Prior to Peterson's stint in the Olympics, she won the Junior National Amateur Athletic Union Women's 3 meter diving championship in Arizona in 1962, with a score of 394.60 points.

Diving

1967 Pan American Games
Peterson received the bronze medal at the 1967 Pan American Games in the women's 10-meter platform diving championship, losing to gold medal winner American Lesley Bush and silver medal winner Canadian Beverly Boys. Bush received a score of 541.0 points, Boys received a score of 515.45 points, and Peterson received 491.50 points.

1967 National Intercollegiate Championships
Peterson won two gold medals for diving at the 1967 National Intercollegiate Championships later in the same year that she participated in the 1967 Pan American Games.

1968 Summer Olympics
In 1968, Peterson attended Arizona State University studying physical education. During this time, she gained a spot on the United States' Olympic diving team by competing in the women's 10 meter platform competition for the Olympic trials. It was reported by The Arizona Republic the day after Peterson's win that "the mark of Miss Peterson's performance last night was consistency". She was in the lead going into the finals with 169.86 points, later adding 46.74 points, 50.82 points, and 51.75 points to her last three dives. Before this accomplishment, Peterson had not dived for six years. She was the first athlete during the three-day Olympic trials to take first place in both the preliminaries and finals. Lesley Bush, who previously scored eighth place in the event at the 1964 Olympics in Tokyo, placed second.

During the 1968 Summer Olympics in Mexico City, she won a bronze medal in the women's 10 meter platform. Peterson's diving was the first footage of the 1968 Summer Olympics coverage to be aired by ABC in the eastern United States.

References

External links

Ann Peterson Olympic Trials with pictures

1947 births
Living people
Divers at the 1968 Summer Olympics
Olympic bronze medalists for the United States in diving
Sportspeople from Kansas City, Missouri
American female divers
Medalists at the 1968 Summer Olympics
Pan American Games medalists in diving
Pan American Games bronze medalists for the United States
Divers at the 1967 Pan American Games
Medalists at the 1967 Pan American Games
21st-century American women